Erymnia is a genus of brachiopods belonging to the family Terebratulidae.

The species of this genus are found in Caribbean.

Species:

Erymnia angustata 
Erymnia augusta 
Erymnia muralifera

References

Brachiopod genera